The Family without Morals is a 1927 Austrian silent film directed by Max Neufeld and starring Anna Kallina, Colette Brettel, and Carmen Cartellieri.

Cast

References

Bibliography

External links

1927 films
Austrian silent feature films
Films directed by Max Neufeld
Austrian black-and-white films